Charyl is a given name that is an alternate spelling of Carol, variation of Charlie, and contraction of Charlene and Charlotte. Charyl is also used as a variation of Cheryl. 

Charyl Chappuis (born 1992), Thai footballer 
Charyl Chacón (born 1985), Peru-born, Venezuela-raised beauty queen

See also

Charl (name)
Charly (name)
Cheryl (disambiguation)